Arylide yellow, also known as Hansa yellow and monoazo yellow, is a family of organic compounds used as pigments. They are primarily used as industrial colorants including plastics, building paints and inks. They are also used in artistic oil paints, acrylics and watercolors. These pigments are usually semi-transparent and range from orange-yellow to yellow-greens.  Related organic pigments are the diarylide pigments. Overall, these pigments have partially displaced the toxic cadmium yellow in the marketplace. Painters such as Alexander Calder and Jackson Pollock are known to have employed arylide yellow in their artworks.

Production
The compound is obtained by azo coupling of aniline and acetoacetanilide or their derivatives. The class of compounds was discovered in Germany in 1909.

Examples
Members of this class include:
Pigment Yellow 6 (CAS# 2512-29-0), derived from 4-chloro-2-nitroaniline (diazonium precursor) and aniline (acetoacetanilide precursor) to produce medium yellows.
Pigment Yellow 3 (CAS# 6486-23-3), derived from 4-chloro-2-nitroaniline (diazonium precursor) and 2-chloroaniline (acetoacetanilide precursor) to produce greenish-yellows.
Pigment Yellow 16 derived from 2,4-dichloroaniline (diazonium precursor) and tolidine (acetoacetanilide precursor) to produce medium-yellows.
Pigment Yellow 74 (CAS# 6358-31-2), derived from 2-methoxy-4-nitroaniline (diazonium precursor) and 2-methoxyaniline (acetoacetanilide precursor) to produce greenish-yellows.

See also
List of colors

References

Microstructural Characteristics of Paint Pigments
A Deep Technical Insight On Arylide Yellow Organic Pigments
Arylide Yellow GY - Pigment Yellow 74 Industries Details

Pigments
Organic pigments
Shades of yellow
Azo dyes